Thomas William Hingley (born 9 July 1965) is an English singer, songwriter and guitarist, best known as the frontman of Inspiral Carpets.

Early life
Hingley was born in Abingdon, Berkshire (now Oxfordshire) and grew up in nearby Frilford. He is the seventh child of the Russian scholar Ronald Hingley, translator of Chekhov for Oxford University Press. He attended Larkmead School before moving to Manchester in 1984 to study English at Manchester Polytechnic.

Career
Hingley formed a band called Too Much Texas, and got a job collecting glasses at The Haçienda nightclub in Manchester. He joined Inspiral Carpets as lead vocalist in 1989. Inspiral Carpets broke up in 1995 and Hingley started a career as a solo artist, releasing Keep Britain Untidy (2000) and Soulfire (2002), on his label Newmemorabilia Records. Inspiral Carpets later reformed in 2003 to promote their Greatest Hits and tour the UK.

Hingley finally parted company with Inspiral Carpets in February 2011, the band returned to performing and writing with their original pre-1989 singer Stephen Holt who remains their frontman to date. Hingley's memoir Carpet Burns, My life with Inspiral Carpets charts his time with the band from 1989 to 2011.

In 2001, Hingley formed the band The Lovers with Steve and Paul Hanley (both former members of The Fall), Jason Brown, and Kelly Wood. The Lovers' first album, Abba Are The Enemy, was released in 2004. In 2002–03, he joined a reformed Inspiral Carpets for two UK tours and again in 2006/2007.

His second album with the Lovers, Highlights, was released in March 2008. In August 2009 Hingley played the Rebellion Punk Festival in Blackpool. In 2009, Hingley released a new solo acoustic record on Newmemorabilia Records called Thames Valley Delta Blues, a kind of follow up to the earlier, much-acclaimed Keep Britain Untidy.

Discography

Solo albums
Keep Britain Untidy (2000)
Soulfire (2001)
Happiness EP (2002)
Thames Valley Delta Blues (2009)
Sand (2013)
Paper (2013)
Hymns for the hungry (2020)

With Mackay Hingley
Decades (2023)

With Tom Hingley Band
No Peace for the Good Looking (2014)
I love my job (2018)

With Tom Hingley and The Lovers
Work, Rest & Play (EP) (1997)
"Yeah" (single) (2003)
Abba Are The Enemy (album) (2004)
Highlights (album) 2008

With Inspiral Carpets
Studio albums
Life (1990)
The Beast Inside (1991)
Revenge of the Goldfish (1992)
Devil Hopping (1994)

Compilation albums
The Singles (1995)
Radio 1 Sessions (1996)
Greatest Hits (2003)
Cool As (2003)
Keep the Circle (2007)

VHS/DVD
21.07.90 Live at Manchester G-Mex VHS (1990)
The Singles VHS (1995)
Live at Brixton Academy DVD (2004)

EPs
The Peel Sessions (1989)
Cool As Fuck (1990)
Island Head (1990)
The Peel Sessions 1990 (1992)

Singles

With Too Much Texas
Fixed Link (Flexi disk) (1986)
Hurry on Down (1988) on Ugly Man
Juvenilia (2006)

Collaborations
Oliver Klein featuring Tom Hingley: Shakedown/Shakedub (EP) (2002)

References

External links
Official site

1965 births
Living people
English male singers
English songwriters
People from Abingdon-on-Thames
People from Oldham
Musicians from the Metropolitan Borough of Oldham
Inspiral Carpets members
Academics of the University of Salford
Musicians from Manchester
Madchester musicians
Alumni of Manchester Metropolitan University